John Durrant (by 1491 – 1543 or later), of Hastings, Sussex, was an English Member of Parliament. He represented Hastings in 1529 and ?1539.

References

15th-century births
16th-century deaths
People from Hastings
English MPs 1529–1536
English MPs 1539–1540